Sir George Shee, 1st Baronet (1758–1825) was a British government minister. He was made a baronet in 1794.

He was Surveyor General of the Ordnance in Ireland from 1797 to 1799 and also sat in the Parliament of Ireland as the MP for Knocktopher from 1798 until the union with Great Britain in 1800.

After the union he was appointed Under-Secretary of State for the Home Department from 1800 to 1803 and Under-Secretary of State for War and the Colonies from 1806 to 1807. He was elected a Fellow of the Royal Society in 1810.

References

1758 births
1825 deaths
Baronets in the Baronetage of Ireland
Irish MPs 1798–1800
Fellows of the Royal Society
Members of the Parliament of Ireland (pre-1801) for County Kilkenny constituencies